Petricia vernicina, the velvet seastar, is a sea star in the family Asteropseidae. Found in Australia, from Caloundra, in Queensland south to Tasmania and west to Houtman Abrolhos islands off Western Australia. Also at the Kermadec Islands. The depth range is between zero and 60 metres. This seastar feeds on lace coral, sea squirts and sponges.

References

Asteropseidae
Animals described in 1816